Montan  is a municipality in South Tyrol in northern Italy.

Montan may also refer to:

 Montán, a municipality in the comarca of Alto Mijares, Spain
 Montan (troubadour) (fl. c. 1250), a Provençal troubadour whose real name is not known
 Montan Sartre, a Provençal troubadour believed to be Duran Sartor de Paernas (fl. c. 1210–50)
 Montan wax, also known as lignite wax 
 Göran Montan (born 1946), a Swedish politician of the Moderate Party
 Patrick Montan (born 1976), Swiss harpsichordist and musicologist
 Sven Montan (1887–1971), Swedish diver

See also 

 Montana (disambiguation)
 Montagna (disambiguation)
 Montano (disambiguation)